Polytechnic Foundation of Cotabato and Asia, Inc. is a Philippine radio network. Its main office is located at Datu Icdang St. cor. Quezon Blvd., Kidapawan. PCFAI operates a number of stations across places in the country under the Charm Radio brand.

PFCAI Stations

AM Stations

FM Stations

References

Radio stations in the Philippines
Philippine radio networks